In enzymology, an uridine nucleosidase is an enzyme that catalyzes the chemical reaction

uridine + H2O  D-ribose + uracil

Thus, the two substrates of this enzyme are uridine and H2O, whereas its two products are D-ribose and uracil.

This enzyme belongs to the family of hydrolases, specifically those glycosylases that hydrolyse N-glycosyl compounds.  The systematic name of this enzyme class is uridine ribohydrolase. This enzyme is also called uridine hydrolase.  This enzyme participates in pyrimidine metabolism.

Structural studies

References

 

EC 3.2.2
Enzymes of known structure